The Jeju Provincial Council, officially the Jeju Special Self-Governing Provincial Council is the local council of Jeju Province, South Korea.

There are a total of 43 members, with 31 members elected in the First-past-the-post voting system and 7 members elected in Party-list proportional representation. In addition, five education members are also elected under the First-past-the-post voting system.

Current composition 

Negotiation groups can be formed by four or more members.

Organization 
The structure of Council consists of:
Chairman
Two Vice-chairmen
Standing Committees
Council Operation Committee
Autonomy Administration Committee
Health, Welfare and Safety Committee
Environment and City Committee
Culture, Tourism, and Sports Committee
Economic Committee for Agricultural, Fishery, Livestock
Educational Committee
Special Committees
Special Committee on Budget and Accounts
Special Committee on Ethics
Special Committee on 4.3
Special Committee on Administrative investigation

Recent election results

2018 

|- style="text-align:center;"
! rowspan="2" colspan="3" width="200" | Party
! colspan="4" | Constituency
! colspan="4" | Party list
! colspan="4" | Education member
! colspan="2" | Total seats
|- style="text-align:center;"
! width="60" | Votes
! width="40" | %
! width="40" | Seats
! width="32" | ±
! width="60" | Votes
! width="40" | %
! width="40" | Seats
! width="32" | ±
! width="60" | Votes
! width="40" | %
! width="40" | Seats
! width="32" | ±
! width="40" | Seats
! width="32" | ±
|-
| width="1" style="background-color:" |
| style="text-align:left;" colspan=2| Democratic Party of Korea
| 167,815 || 53.65 || 25 || 12
| 185,218 || 54.25 || 4 || 1
| colspan=4 rowspan=7 
| 29 || 13
|-
| width="1" style="background-color:" |
| style="text-align:left;" colspan=2| Liberty Korea Party
| 49,096 || 15.70 || 1 || 12
| 61,705 || 18.07 || 1 || 3
| 2 || 15
|-
| width="1" style="background-color:" |
| style="text-align:left;" colspan=2| Bareunmirae Party
| 9,588 || 3.07 || 1 || new
| 25,503 || 7.47 || 1 || new
| 2 || new
|-
| width="1" style="background-color:" |
| style="text-align:left;" colspan=2| Justice Party
| 5,332 || 1.70 || 0 || 0
| 40,553 || 11.87 || 1 || 1
| 1 || 1
|-
| width="1" style="background-color:" |
| style="text-align:left;" colspan=2| Green Party Korea
| colspan=4 
| 16,640 || 4.87 || 0 || 0
| 0 || 0
|-
| width="1" style="background-color:#DC143C" |
| style="text-align:left;" colspan=2| Labor Party
| colspan=4 
| 6,277 || 1.83 || 0 || new
| 0 || new
|-
| width="1" style="background-color:" |
| style="text-align:left;" colspan=2| Minjung Party
| 878 || 0.27 || 0 || new
| 5,496 || 1.60 || 0 || new
| 0 || new
|-
| width="1" style="background-color:" |
| style="text-align:left;" colspan=2| Independents
| 80,093 || 25.61 || 4 || 1
| colspan=4 
| 90,244 || 100.00 || 5 || –
| 9 || 1
|-
|- style="background-color:#E9E9E9"
| colspan=3 style="text-align:center;" | Total
| 312,802 || 100.00 || 31 || –
| 341,392 || 100.00 || 7 || –
| 90,244 || 100.00 || 5 || –
| 43 || –
|}

References 

Jeju Province
Provincial councils of South Korea